SEB Arena is tennis and squash arena in Vilnius.

It was completed in 2008. In 2009 and 2010 SEB Arena hosted Davis Cup matches.

References

 Stadiums in Lithuania. Worldstadiums.com.

External links 
Official website

Indoor arenas in Lithuania
Sports venues in Vilnius
Tennis venues in Lithuania